{{DISPLAYTITLE:C12H14N2O2}}
The molecular formula C12H14N2O2 (molar mass : 218.25 g/mol, exact mass : 218.105528) may refer to:

 Mephenytoin
 1-Methyltryptophan
 Abrin abrine N methyl tryptophan , alkaloid in Abrus
 Normelatonin
 Phenylpiracetam
 Primidone
 Rogletimide